Cunningham House may refer to:
Cunningham House (Windsor, California), a Windsor historical landmark
 Cunningham House (Salvisa, Kentucky), listed on the National Register of Historic Places (NRHP) in Mercer County
 Cunningham House (Glens Falls, New York), listed on the NRHP in Warren County
 Captain James & Susannah Cunningham Homestead, near Comanche, Texas, listed on the NRHP in Comanche County